James Raymond Greengrass (October 24, 1927 – September 9, 2019) was an American professional baseball player. A power-hitting outfielder whose career was hindered by phlebitis, Greengrass appeared in 504 games over five seasons (1952–56) in Major League Baseball (MLB) for the Cincinnati Reds / Redlegs and Philadelphia Phillies.

Baseball career

Minor leagues
Greengrass was born in Addison, New York, and attended Addison High School. In 1944, he signed with the New York Yankees at age 16 during World War II and his early minor league baseball career spanned almost seven full years, including a failed attempt as a pitcher and two years (1946–47) devoted to military duty. Finally, on August 28, 1952, the pennant-bound Yankees packaged Greengrass, who had spent the season in the Double-A Texas League, three other players and cash in a trade to Cincinnati for the Reds' former All-Star pitcher, Ewell Blackwell.

Cincinnati Redlegs
Away from the Yankees, Greengrass got his chance to play regularly in the major leagues. That September he started 17 games in the Cincinnati outfield, collected 24 runs batted in with five home runs, and batted .309. The following season, 1953, Greengrass started 153 of the Redlegs' 155 official National League games in left field, hit 20 homers, and with 100 RBI was one of three Redlegs (along with Ted Kluszewski and Gus Bell) to hit the century mark in runs driven in. He finished sixth in NL Rookie of the Year balloting. In 1954 his production fell off slightly, with 139 games played and 95 runs batted in, but Greengrass reached a personal best in home runs (27). Greengrass shares with Pop Dillon the record for the most doubles hit on the opening day of the Major League Baseball season, with his four two-baggers on April 13, 1954.

Philadelphia Phillies
In 1955, Greengrass collected only four hits in his first 39 at bats through April 29. On the following day, April 30, he was traded to the Phillies in a three-for-three deal, and celebrated his arrival by getting two hits and his first 1955 home run in his Philadelphia debut on May 1. He hit safely in his next five games as a Phillie as well. He eventually leveled off, however, to bat .272 with 12 homers in 94 games (including 79 starts in right field) with the Phillies. However, 1955 was his last good year in the majors. His problems with phlebitis began that season and he struggled through the 1956 campaign, his last year in MLB, hitting .205 with five homers as a backup outfielder.

Greengrass batted .269 lifetime during his big-league service, with his 482 hits including 82 doubles, 16 triples and 69 home runs. Despite his condition, he was able to continue his pro career in the higher levels of minor league baseball into 1961.

Death
Greengrass died in Cartersville , Georgia, on September 9, 2019.

References

External links

1927 births
2019 deaths
Baseball players from New York (state)
Beaumont Roughnecks players
Binghamton Triplets players
Cincinnati Redlegs players
Cincinnati Reds players
Houston Astros scouts
Jacksonville Jets players
Major League Baseball outfielders
Miami Marlins (IL) players
Muskegon Clippers players
Muskegon Reds players
Newark Bears (IL) players
People from Addison, New York
People from Chatsworth, Georgia
Philadelphia Phillies players
Portland Beavers players
Sacramento Solons players
San Diego Padres (minor league) players
Wellsville Yankees players